The 1962 NCAA University Division baseball tournament was played at the end of the 1962 NCAA University Division baseball season to determine the national champion of college baseball.  The tournament concluded with eight teams competing in the College World Series, a double-elimination tournament in its sixteenth year.  Eight regional districts sent representatives to the College World Series with preliminary rounds within each district serving to determine each representative.  These events would later become known as regionals.  Each district had its own format for selecting teams, resulting in 27 teams participating in the tournament at the conclusion of their regular season, and in some cases, after a conference tournament.  The College World Series was held in Omaha, NE from June 11 to June 16.  The sixteenth tournament's champion was Michigan, coached by Don Lund.  The Most Outstanding Player was Bob Garibaldi of runner-up Santa Clara.

Regionals
The opening rounds of the tournament were played across eight district sites across the country, each consisting of a field of two to four teams. Each district tournament, except District 2, was double-elimination. The winners of each district advanced to the College World Series.

Bold indicates winner.  * indicates extra innings.

District 1 at Springfield, MA

District 2 at University Park, PA

District 3 at Gastonia, NC

District 4 at Kalamazoo, MI

District 5 at Columbia, MO

District 6 at Tucson, AZ

District 7 at Greeley, CO

Note: Colorado State College of Education became Northern Colorado University in 1970.

District 8 at Santa Clara, CA

College World Series

Participants

Results

Bracket

Game results

All-Tournament Team
The following players were members of the All-Tournament Team.

Notable players
 Colorado State College: 
 Florida State: Woody Woodward
 Holy Cross: Dick Joyce, John Peterman
 Ithaca: 
 Michigan: Dave Campbell, Fritz Fisher
 Missouri: Byron Browne, John Sevcik
 Santa Clara: John Boccabella, Nelson Briles, Tim Cullen, Ernie Fazio, Bob Garibaldi, Larry Loughlin, Pete Magrini
 Texas: Bill Bethea, Chuck Hartenstein

See also
 1962 NAIA World Series

Notes

References

NCAA Division I Baseball Championship
Tournament